Liberty Township is one of thirteen townships in St. Joseph County, in the U.S. state of Indiana. As of the 2000 census, its population was 3,053.

Geography

Cities, towns, villages
 North Liberty

Adjacent townships
 Greene Township (northeast)
 Union Township (east)
 North Township, Marshall County (southeast)
 Polk Township, Marshall County (south)
 Lincoln Township (southwest)
 Lincoln Township, LaPorte County (west)

Cemeteries
The township contains these four cemeteries: Fair, Old, Porter and Westlawn.

Major highways

Lakes
 Elizabeth Lake
 Rupel Lake
 Worster Lake

School districts
 John Glenn School Corporation

Political districts
 Indiana's 2nd congressional district
 State House District 21
 State Senate District 9

References
 United States Census Bureau 2008 TIGER/Line Shapefiles
 United States Board on Geographic Names (GNIS)
 IndianaMap

External links
 Indiana Township Association
 United Township Association of Indiana

Townships in St. Joseph County, Indiana
South Bend – Mishawaka metropolitan area
Townships in Indiana